Pietermaritzburg, like most South African cities, uses Metropolitan or "M" routes for important intra-city routes, a layer below National (N) roads and Regional (R) roads. Each city's M roads are independently numbered.

In South Africa, Metropolitan or "M" routes are mostly used in metropolitan municipalities and Pietermaritzburg is the only exception whereby it is not a metropolitan municipality yet still uses these road designations.

Table of M roads

See Also 
 Numbered Routes in South Africa

References 

Roads in South Africa
Transport in KwaZulu-Natal